Vallurupalli Nageswara Rao Vignana Jyothi Institute of Engineering and Technology (VNRVJIET) is a private engineering college in Hyderabad, India recognized by All India Council for Technical Education(AICTE) and affiliated to the Jawaharlal Nehru Technological University, Hyderabad.

Undergraduate programs- CE, EEE, ME, ECE, CSE, EIE and IT in the institute are accredited by the National Board of Accreditation (NBA) New Delhi, since 2008. The institute has Autonomous Status till 2028-2029 A.Y. granted by UGC.

Academics

Rankings
According to 2020 NIRF Rankings, VNR VJIET is ranked 127 in Engineering Category.

Undergraduate
The minimum qualification for admissions is a pass in intermediate (12th) conducted by Andhra Pradesh Board of Intermediate Education or Telangana Board of Intermediate Education. Seats are generally filled in two categories namely, A and B. Category A seats are filled in through state level entrance exam, TS EAMCET. Category B seats are filled in through the NRI quota or based on other state or national level entrance exams(JEE Mains). Diploma holders are enrolled into the second year of BTech course to extent of 10% of sanctioned intake based on merit in TS ECET, under lateral entry scheme. The college offers Automobile Engineering, Civil Engineering, Civil Engineering, Computer Science Engineering(Artificial Intelligence and Machine learning), Computer Science Engineering(Cyber Security, Data Science, and Internet of Things), Electronics and Communication Engineering, Electrical and Electronics Engineering, Electronics and Instrumentation Engineering, Information Technology and Mechanical Engineering courses for BTech students.

Student life

Student Clubs 
The Institute also has number of clubs ranging from dance (Livewire crew), Music (Cresendo),arts(Creative arts at VNR),theatre/short-film club (VJ-Theatro),Scintilate(Photography club),Social clubs (VNRSF-student force), NSS(national service scheme),N-army, Stentorian, VJSV(vignana jyothi sahithi vanam), Drama- Dramatrix and many more.

Student Chapters
The institute has some active student chapters involved in certain activities. The following are the active student chapters: ACM Student Chapter, IEI Student Chapter, IEEE Student Chapter, ISOI Student Chapter, VSI Student Chapter, CSI Student Chapter, VGLUG Chapter, SAE Club, Fierce Formula India, ISTE Student Forum, IETE Student Forum, ASMS Student Chapter.

Four students of VNR Vignana Jyothi Institute of Engineering and Technology (VNRVJIET) have been named University Innovation Fellows following a six-week training conducted by the Stanford University, USA.

Athletics
The institute has a sports complex for use of students. It features a hardwood court for playing basketball or badminton, dedicated rooms for table tennis, cue sports, carroms, chess, gym with showers and locker (cabinet). The college is equipped with a common football and cricket ground, a basketball court, volleyball court. The institute students have won many national events. The college sports department conducts national level sports fest every year.

Controversies

2014 Beas River disaster refers to the 8 June 2014 drowning of 24 second-year engineering students (six female and 18 male) and one tour operator from V.N.R. Vignana Jyothi Institute of Engineering and Technology of Hyderabad at the Beas River in Himachal Pradesh. The accident took place in the Thalout area (Shalanala Village) of Mandi district and was the result of a sudden surge of river water released upstream from the Larji hydro electric project.

References

External links
VNR VJIET Official Web Site.
 VNRVJIET Official YouTube Channel
VNR VJIET Alumni Association.

Educational institutions established in 1995
Engineering colleges in Hyderabad, India
Engineering colleges in Telangana
1995 establishments in Andhra Pradesh
University and college campuses in India